Van Nes is a Dutch surname. Notable people with the surname include:

Eeke van Nes (born 1969), Dutch rower
Hadriaan van Nes (born 1942), Dutch rower
Irving van Nes (born 1949), Dutch field hockey player
Johan van Nes (died 1650), Dutch painter

See also

 Vanness Wu (b. 1978), Taiwanese-American actor and singer
 Carol Vaness (b. 1952), American soprano
 Vanes
 
 Vannes (disambiguation)
Van Ness (disambiguation)
Van (disambiguation)
Nes (disambiguation)

Dutch-language surnames